The Tampa Bay Storm were a professional arena football franchise of the Arena Football League (AFL) based in Tampa, Florida. The franchise was originally known as the Pittsburgh Gladiators, and was one of the founding members of the AFL in 1987.  The Storm is the oldest team in AFL, since the other original teams, Chicago Bruisers, Denver Dynamite, and Washington Commandos, have all folded. They are the last of the original four franchises to have operated in continuous existence from the formation of the league until the present. The Gladiators participated in ArenaBowl I and ArenaBowl III, losing both games. The franchise moved from Pittsburgh, Pennsylvania to Tampa, Florida in 1991, and changed its name to the Tampa Bay Storm.

In Tampa, the Storm won ArenaBowl V, ArenaBowl VII, ArenaBowl IX, ArenaBowl X, and ArenaBowl XVII. They also played in and lost ArenaBowl XII. In their 25-year history (through the 2012 season), they have an overall regular season record of 207 wins, and 125 losses.  They have made 22 postseason appearances, and have an overall postseason record of 23 wins and 17 losses. The Storm ended the 2006 season with a 7–9 record (4th in their Division), ending a 19-year streak of playoff appearances, the longest in AFL. Since 1997, the team has played its home games at Amalie Arena (previously the Ice Palace, the St. Pete Times Forum, and the Tampa Bay Times Forum) which is located in Tampa.

In 2009, the AFL announced it had suspended operations indefinitely, and canceled the 2009 season. On December 10, 2009, the Storm announced that they would be back for the 2010 season when the league relaunched. In 2010, the team was also moved to the American Conference's South division. The Storm folded in December 2017.

Note: The Finish, Wins, and Losses columns list regular season results and exclude any postseason play. This list documents the season–by–season records of the Storm's franchise from 1987 to present, including postseason records, and league awards for individual players or head coaches.

References
General

 
 
 
Specific

Arena Football League seasons by team
 
Pittsburgh-related lists
Pennsylvania sports-related lists
Florida sports-related lists
Tampa Bay Storm